|}

The Johnstown Novice Hurdle is a Grade 2 National Hunt hurdle horse race in Ireland. It is run at Naas in February over a distance of about 2 miles and during the race there are eight hurdles to be jumped. The race was first run in 1984 as a Listed race and it was upgraded to Grade 2 in 2003. The race is currently sponsored by Paddy Power bookmakers and has been run under sponsored titles since 2011.

Records
Leading jockey (4 wins):
 Charlie Swan - Mass Appeal (1991), Atone (1993), Sound Man (1994), No Discount (2000) 
 Barry Geraghty – Sallie's Girl (1999), Newmill (2004), 	Merdeka (2006), Kazal (2007) 

Leading trainer  (5 wins):
 Willie Mullins -  Macs Gildoran (2001), Dare To Doubt (2011), Felix Yonger (2012), Annie Power (2013), Echoes In Rain (2021)

Winners

See also
 Horse racing in Ireland
 List of Irish National Hunt races

References
Racing Post:

National Hunt races in Ireland
National Hunt hurdle races
Naas Racecourse